Beijing Univ. of Tech. West Gate station is a station on Line 14 of the Beijing Subway. It was opened on December 26, 2015.

Station layout 
The station has an underground island platform.

Exits 
There are 3 exits, lettered A, C, and D. Exit C is accessible.

Gallery

References

Railway stations in China opened in 2015
Beijing Subway stations in Chaoyang District